The Derby Mercury was a local, broadsheet newspaper, based in Derby, Derbyshire, England. It ran from 1732 until 1900.

References 

Publications disestablished in 1900
1732 establishments in England
Publications established in 1732
Newspapers published in Derbyshire